At Point Blank may refer to:
 At Point Blank (film), a 2003 Swedish action film
 At Point Blank (TV series), a Hong Kong romantic drama television series